SBO may refer to:

 Jawa Pos TV, a television station in Surabaya, Indonesia formerly known as SBO TV
 SAP Business One, an enterprise resource planning software
 Senior British Officer, see Group captain
 Small bowel obstruction, a blockage of normal passage of digested food through the small intestine
 Small buffer optimization, a programming technique to save memory allocation in small containers
 Small business owner, small business activities
 Sommers-Bausch Observatory, an astronomical observatory on the University of Colorado Boulder campus
 Systems Biology Ontology, a project for the development of Systems Biology-oriented vocabularies and ontologies
 Tougeki – Super Battle Opera, a Japanese fighting video game tournament